Fruit waxing is the process of covering fruits (and, in some cases, vegetables) with artificial waxing material. Natural wax is removed first, usually by washing, followed by a coating of a biological or petroleum derived wax. Potentially allergenic proteins (peanut, soy, dairy, wheat) may be combined with shellac.

The primary reasons for waxing are to prevent water loss (making up for the removal in washing of the natural waxes in fruits that have them, particularly citrus but also, for example, apples) and thus slow shrinkage and spoilage, and to improve appearance. Dyes may be added to further enhance appearance, and sometimes fungicides. Fruits were waxed to cause fermentation as early as the 12th or the 13th century; commercial producers began waxing citrus to extend shelf life in the 1920s and 1930s. Aesthetics (consumer preference for shiny fruit) has since become the main reason. In addition to fruit, some vegetables can usefully be waxed, such as cassava. A distinction may be made between storage wax, pack-out wax (for immediate sale), and high-shine wax (for optimum attractiveness).

Produce that is often waxed 
A number of sources list the following as produce which may be waxed before shipping to stores:

apples

 avocados
 bell and hot peppers
 cantaloupes
 cucumbers
 eggplant
 grapefruit
 lemons
 limes
 mangoes
 melons
 nectarines
 oranges
 papayas
 parsnips
 passion fruit
 peaches
 pears
 pineapple
 plums
 pumpkins
 rutabaga
 squash
 sweet potatoes
 tangarines
 tomatoes
 turnips
 yucca

Materials 
The materials used to wax produce depend to some extent on regulations in the country of production and/or export. Both natural waxes (carnauba, shellac, beeswax or resin) and petroleum-based waxes (usually proprietary formulae) are used, and often more than one wax is combined to create the desired properties for the fruit or vegetable being treated. Wax may be applied in a volatile petroleum-based solvent but is now more commonly applied via a water-based emulsion. Blended paraffin waxes applied as an oil or paste are often used on vegetables.

See also
 Food coating
 Glazing agent

References

Further reading
 V. Thirupathi, S. Sasikala and Z. John Kennedy. "Preservation of fruits and vegetables by wax coating". Science Tech Entrepreneur August 2006. Online at scribd.com.
 Barbara Ritter, Jörg Schulte, Erhard Schulte and Hans-Peter Thier. "Detection of coating waxes on apples by differential scanning calorimetry". European Food Research and Technology 212.5 (2000) 603–07 (pdf)

Food preservation